Krystyna Danilczyk-Zabawska (born 14 January 1968) is a former Polish shot putter.

She was born as Krystyna Danilczyk in Kopczany near Lipsk nad Biebrzą. She lives in Białystok. Her husband and former coach is Przemysław Zabawski, also a former shot putter. Their daughter Daria Zabawska, born 1995, competes in the discus throw.

Her personal best throw is 19.42 metres, achieved in July 1992 in Lyon.

Achievements

References

 
 

1968 births
Living people
Polish female shot putters
Athletes (track and field) at the 1992 Summer Olympics
Athletes (track and field) at the 2000 Summer Olympics
Athletes (track and field) at the 2004 Summer Olympics
Athletes (track and field) at the 2008 Summer Olympics
Olympic athletes of Poland
People from Augustów County
Sportspeople from Podlaskie Voivodeship
Goodwill Games medalists in athletics
Jagiellonia Białystok athletes
Podlasie Białystok athletes
Competitors at the 2001 Goodwill Games